Scholtzia spatulata is a shrub species in the family Myrtaceae that is endemic to Western Australia.

It blooms between September and January producing pink-white flowers.

It is found on sandplains along the west coast in the Mid West region of Western Australia around Northampton  where it grows in sandy soils.

References

spatulata
Plants described in 1867